From the 1860s onwards a steadily increasing number of British dioceses, especially in the Church of England, began issuing publications containing a variety of news, comment and educational articles relating to their work.  Similar examples were eventually added by a number of Roman Catholic dioceses and by various ecclesiastical denominations overseas.

Early examples

The earliest regular example was seemingly the Diocesan Magazine introduced about 1867 in the Anglican diocese of Lichfield (also incidentally the centre for some of the earliest parish magazines). This was during the episcopate of bishop John Lonsdale.  However it seems mainly to have been a localised version of a separate magazine, Mission Life. There had previously been a short-lived Oxford Parochial Magazine, but this had been neither published by nor centred on the diocese.

During the Victorian era such publications were frequently named as the Diocesan Gazette or simply as the Diocesan Magazine.  From the early 20th century many dioceses began to produce shorter monthly news bulletins or leaflets, often designed for possible inclusion as an insert within the local parish magazine. These could either replace the older magazines (sometimes being quite similar to some of the less ambitious gazettes) or alternatively might be ancillary to them.

Occasionally the introduction of a new diocesan gazette might attract scepticism or controversy: in London diocese there were complaints of early high-handed techniques being used in efforts to increase their circulation.

Format and content

Formats, layouts and titles have however changed over the years to reflect the changing needs and circumstances of the church. Many of the earliest titles have now ceased publication, usually being replaced by new ventures meeting more modern needs. Some of these have now adopted a more popular newspaper-type style.

Typical contents of the earlier magazines would include a pastoral letter from a bishop or another senior clergyman; theological reflections; particulars of the bishop's engagements during the coming month; comments on recent national or local news; details of forthcoming events and meetings; and particulars of recent clerical appointments.  They were not always well regarded: one writer commented regarding diocesan leaflets in 1949: Unfortunately, most of these must be classed as dull productions and some … contribute little to the Christian cause and may even have a negative influence. As with the parish magazine the trouble seems to be a style of writing and a format which repels rather than attracts. But there is some excuse for the Diocesan Leaflet as many of them are written primarily for the clergy, to give them news of conferences, retreats and other events … It would be better to supply the clergy with their news in mimeograph form and devote all the Leaflet space to news of interest to the laity.

There was some gradual increase in the use of engravings and photographs, particularly after the technological improvements in the 1890s, including halftone reproduction of illustrations and the introduction of offset printing.

Location of copies

Surviving examples of many of these publications can often be traced in libraries or in the episcopal collections held by the local county record office or county archive service (which today usually serves as the principal diocesan record office).  Since a lot of them were included as insets within parish magazines of differing dates, many of the back issues surviving today are included within incomplete sets.

The British Library also holds many examples, although their integrated online catalogue suggests that their overall coverage is still patchy.  They do, however, also hold some magazines from Irish dioceses and from other overseas dioceses.

In recent years an increasing number of dioceses have been publishing alternative versions of their latest periodicals in an online format.

Some past and present periodicals: Anglican dioceses in UK and Ireland

England & Wales

BANGOR: Bangor Diocesan Gazette, founded under bishop John Charles Jones, 1954.  Discontinued 19??, Nexus, online diocesan magazine, current.

BATH & WELLS: Ruridecanal Diocesan and Parish Magazine, 1883-c1917.
Bath & Wells Diocesan Gazette: some copies 1906-1954 (at least) in Somerset Record Office.
Manna, quarterly magazine launched Sep 2010 including online version.

BIRMINGHAM: Diocesan Magazine 1905, the year of the creation of the diocese.  Appeared initially as the Worcester & Birmingham Diocesan Magazine.
Birmingham Diocesan Magazine (being the messenger of the Bishop and a monthly record of church work in the diocese); edited by the Rev. Canon Hobhouse. Vol. 1. no. 1-vol. 18. no. 12.(Jan. 1906-Dec. 1923); also new series vol. 1. no. 1-vol. 6. no. 66. (Jan. 1924-Dec. 1929).

BLACKBURN: Manchester and Blackburn Diocesan Magazine (continuation of Manchester Diocesan Magazine) N.S. Vol. 1. (1927)"

The Crosier (Blackburn diocesan magazine) 1949–1964;

The See of Blackburn 1965-

See, Blackburn diocesan newsletter, current 2010s.

BRADFORD: The Bishop's Messenger/Bradford Diocesan Messenger,  before 1946-1956
Bradford Diocesan News 1957-2000s
NewsRound Bradford diocesan newspaper, online from 2010

BRISTOL: Bristol Diocesan Magazine vol. 1, no. 1-vol. 23, no. 276. Jan. 1899-Dec. 1921.
Bristol Diocesan gazette Vol.1, no.1 (Jan. 1922)-v.50, no.606 (June 1972)
The Bristol Diocesan Review: New ser., v.24, no.1 (Jan. 1922)-v.33, no.120 (Dec. 1931)

CANTERBURY: Diocesan Gazette, commenced 1892
Canterbury Diocesan Gazette, the official organ of the Archbishop of Canterbury, 1892-

CARLISLE: Diocesan Gazette, commenced 1896 (volume 34 by 1930; issues 1898-1941 held in Cumbria Record Office, Carlisle; discontinued ?1952

Carlisle Diocesan Gazette, etc. March 1907-Dec. 1951; Carlisle Diocesan News/The News. Jan. 1952- (still current, four-page magazine insert]) 8º

The Way (originally The Way in Cumbria), a colour newspaper of Carlisle diocese but subsequently expanded to include other denominations within the county, three times yearly (Easter, Summer & Christmas), c1994-date)

CHELMSFORD:  St. Albans & Chelmsford Diocesan Gazette,. vol. 19. no. 3-12. March-Dec. 1914;
Essex Churchman: the official monthly journal of the Diocese of Chelmsford, No. 1 (July 1952)-no. 425 (Oct. 1987);
East Window (Chelmsford diocesan monthly), No.1 (Nov. 1987)-no. 227 (Sept. 2006)

The Month online Chelmsford diocesan magazine

CHESTER: Diocesan Gazette, operational by 1891; The Chester Diocesan Gazette (Chester Diocesan Leaflet.) no. 191, etc. Jan. 1902- ?

CHICHESTER: Chichester Diocesan Gazette, etc. vol. 9. no. 97-vol. 20. no. 75. Jan. 1902-Dec. 1946
Chichester Diocesan Leaflet, new series. vol. 1. no. 1-vol. 41. no. 12. Jan. 1947-Dec. 1987, 1988-2003

Chichester Magazine, bi-monthly, online, 2010s

COVENTRY: Coventry Diocesan Gazette, 1940s-

DERBY: See of Derby Diocesan Magazine,  vol. 1. no. 1-vol. 4. no. 48. Jan. 1928-Dec. 1931.
Derby Diocesan Leaflet, vol. 1. no. 1-vol. 16. no. 7. Jan. 1932-July 1947.
Derby Diocesan News,  vol. 1. no. 1, etc. Aug. 1947- etc.

DURHAM: Diocesan Gazette, operational by 1887. The Bishoprick magazine by c1924 (volume 28 reached by 1953).

ELY: Ely Diocesan Remembrancer, May 1885-Dec 1915, continued 1916-[1960s?] as Ely Diocesan Gazette

Ely Ensign (discontinued 2007; discussed at Diocesan Synod 10 March 2007).

EXETER: Exeter Diocesan Gazette, some monthly examples, 1902–1911 in Devon Record Office. Exeter Diocesan leaflet 1949–1982, monthly, since discontinued.
Replaced by Exeter Diocesan News 1983-date, monthly, still in progress, see county library list.
Exeter Diocesan Magazine (operational by 2009)
Information from online catalogues of Devon Record Office, Exeter.

GLOUCESTER: Diocesan Magazine (37 volumes from 1906 to 1942 at Gloucestershire Archives)
Gloucester Diocesan Gazette, no. 1, etc. Jan. 1947, etc.

Our Diocese of Gloucester bulletin, online 2010-

GUILDFORD:  Guildford Diocesan Gazette/Guildford Diocesan Herald/Guildford Herald, 1928–2006; The Wey 2007- ; also Guildford Diocesan News/Diocesan Leaflet, 1952-1988: copies at Surrey History Centre

HEREFORD: Hereford Diocesan News, Jan. 1965-?
The NEWSpaper (quarterly), 24 pages, current; also “available online in its entirety”.

LEICESTER: Leicester Diocesan Leaflet, 4º,  1927- .

News and Views: Leicester Diocesan Magazine

LICHFIELD: Diocesan Magazine, operational before 1868. No complete surviving copies of this early version are known to exist. It seems to have been a localised version of the Mission Life magazine, with early editions being published or printed at Derby by Bemrose & Sons. No full copies in British Library, nor with County Archive or Library services in Staffordshire.

Lichfield Diocesan Churchman c1872-1879. Incomplete series 1873-1875 held by William Salt Library, Stafford; 1876-1879 held by Derbyshire Record Office.

Lichfield Diocesan Magazine: first issue January 1880

Lichfield Diocesan Magazine 1880-?
Lichfield Diocesan Magazine a  monthly record of church work for the diocese, 1880, etc.
Vol. 4 no. 1 (Jan. 1883)-v. 5 no. 12 (Dec. 1884)

LINCOLN: Diocesan Magazine, operational by 1886;.
Lincoln Diocesan Magazine, vol. 18. no. 198 - vol. 92. no. 12, 1902–1976.

LIVERPOOL: Diocesan Gazette, operational by 1882.
Liverpool Review/[Liverpool Diocesan Review]: Vol. 5 (1930)-
Diocesan leaflet, late 1940s, described as a better style … printed in Crown 8vo size instead of the more common quarto size, it has eight pages of good readable type, mostly in double columns, with ample white space between the paragraphs and good titling.

LLANDAFF: Diocesan Magazine, quarterly from March 1899
Llandaff Diocesan Magazine, a quarterly record, editor: The Rev. C. E. T. Griffith. [vol. 1. no. 2-4: the Rev. W. A. Downing, no. 5, etc.] vol. 1. no. 2-vol. 11. no. 3. June 1899-Oct. 1919; later issues also in  National Library of Wales

LONDON: Diocesan Magazine, by 1887
London Diocesan Magazine, May 1886-Dec. 1927
London Diocesan Leaflet, vol. 1. no. 1-vol. 7. no. 12; vol. 11. no. 1-vol. 22. no. 12. Jan. 1928-Dec. 1934; Jan. 1938-Dec. 1949

MANCHESTER: Manchester Diocesan Churchman, first issue October 1879

Manchester Diocesan Magazine, edited by the Rev. Harold J. Smith, 1904- etc.

Manchester Diocesan Magazine, continued 1927 as Manchester and Blackburn Diocesan Magazin, N.S. Vol. 1. (1927); later continued. as Manchester Churchman, 1928–1930; continued as Manchester Diocesan Leaflet 1931-?

Diocesan Magazine Crux (stray issues 1970s; online version current 2010s).

MONMOUTH:  Monmouth Diocesan Gazette, 1960s/Monmouth Diocesan Newsletter, 1968-? in National Library of Wales catalogues 
Diocesan Newsletter, online.

NEWCASTLE: Newcastle Diocesan Gazette, 1899-?
Newcastle Diocesan Gazette, 1907-1926 (at least): Northumberland County Archives Service.

NORWICH: Diocesan Gazette, by 1894

OXFORD: Oxford Parochial Magazine or The Oxford Parochial Magazine and Monthly Diocesan Record (later The Oxford Magazine & Church Advocate), commenced 1860 but disappeared by 1864.  In part downloadable free of charge from Google eBookstore  (1860). Volumes 1-3 (1860–63) in  British Library catalogue.  Publishers: London, E Thompson, 3 Burleigh Street, Strand; Oxford, W R Bowden.

Diocesan Magazine, first issue 1868; favourably mentioned by a correspondent to "Reading Mercury", 21 March 1868.  "Published by Messrs. Macintosh" and containing "a large amount of very interesting Missionary Intelligence"; further commended by the diocesan bishop.

Diocesan Magazine, 1902-

The Door, 20th century

PETERBOROUGH: Diocesan Magazine, a monthly record of Church work for the Diocese, etc. vol. 1. no. 1-vol. 32. no. 384. Jan. 1889-Dec. 1920.
Peterborough Diocesan Leaflet, 1921-

PORTSMOUTH: Portsmouth Diocesan Gazette 1928-?;
Portsmouth Diocesan News, vol. 16. no. 1, etc. Jan. 1956, etc.  Portsmouth Diocesan Courier, 1962-

RIPON: Diocesan Gazette, operational by 1898;
Ripon Diocesan Gazette, etc. vol. 13. no.1-vol. 21. no. 12 Jan. 1902-Dec. 1910; New series. no. 1–204. Jan. 1911-Dec. 1927;
Ripon Diocesan News, no. 1-95. Jan. 1959-Dec. 1966.

ROCHESTER: Diocesan Gazette, by 1896
Rochester Diocesan Notes, no. 1-135 (with gaps), 1929–1950; Diocesan News Letter, no. 136-?. Jan. 1951-?

ST ALBANS: St Albans Diocesan Gazette: volume 9 by 1904;  '
'St. Albans & Chelmsford Diocesan Gazette, vol. 19. no. 3-12. March-Dec. 1914;St. Albans Diocesan Gazette, New series. Jan. 1915-Dec. 1927

ST ASAPH:  St Asaph Diocesan News 1970-? in  National Library of WalesTeulu St Asaph, online diocesan magazine, from 2007

ST DAVIDS: Diocesan Gazette & Ruridecanal Chronicle: quarterly from Aug 1900Esgobaeth Ty Ddewi Taflen Yr Esgobaeth/Diocese of St Davids Diocesan Leaflet: quarterly from c1976 (No. 36, Summer 1985).Pobl Dewi: quarterly newspaper from Dec 2003- ;  see online archive

ST EDMUNDSBURY & IPSWICH: Diocesan Magazine, volume xxi by 1935 so presumably commencing almost from the foundation of the diocese in 1914. Specially commended during the late 1940s as being very well printed, newsy in the right way, and with an excellent cover ... Incidentally it carries quite a lot of advertisements and is sold for 2d, a price at which no one can cavil at if value is given.Diocesan Magazine for the County of Suffolk. Diocese of S. Edmundsbury and Ipswich, Ipswich, 1914- (Imperfect; wanting vol. 1. no. 5)East Anglican Magazine, current, online, No. 118 by November 2011.

SALISBURY: Salisbury Diocesan Gazette, vol. 1, no. 1 (Mar. 1888)-vol. 60, no. 694 (Nov./Dec. 1947).

SHEFFIELD:  Sheffield Diocesan Gazette 1914-

SODOR & MAN:  Manx  Church Magazine from c1890; vol. xiv by 1904

SOUTHWARK: Southwark Diocesan Gazette, 1905-

SOUTHWELL: Diocesan Magazine, by June 1888.Southwell Diocesan Magazine, 1888-Southwell Diocesan News, leaflet, by the 1950s.

SWANSEA & BRECON:  Diocesan Leaflet/Diocesan News, 1970s-? in National Library of WalesDiocesan News, current 2010s.

TRURO: The Church in Cornwall, introduced under bishop Edward White Benson by 1878; 1872-1883 in British LibraryTruro Diocesan Magazine, a monthly record of church work for the diocese. [vol. I.-III. edited by Augustus Blair Donaldson. vol. IV., etc., edited by Arthur John Worlledge. Truro, 1901, etc. Lacking vol. II., no. 15; vol. IV., no. 45; vol. V., no. 49, 50; vol. VII., no. 67, 71Truro Diocesan Gazette by 1926

WAKEFIELD: Wakefield Diocesan Gazette, vol. 19. no. 3, 1913-?Wakefield Diocesan News 1968-? ;See-Link, 1990-2002;The Flame 2002-Apr 2004;Awake, current Wakefield diocesan magazine, 2004-

WINCHESTER: Winchester Diocesan Magazine, proposed 1890 and operational by 1899.

WORCESTER: Worcester [Worcester and Birmingham] Diocesan Magazine (Gazette), vol. 1. no. 1-vol. 40. no. 12. Oct. 1893-Dec. 1933.Worcester Diocesan Magazine, vol. 2, 1894-?

YORK: Diocesan Magazine, by 1892; still issued in the 1970s.York Diocesan Magazine, vol. 5. no. 7-vol. 19. no. 12. July, 1896-Dec. 1910York Diocesan Gazette, published under the direction of the Archbishop. vol. 20. no. 1-vol. 38. no. 12. Jan. 1911-Dec. 1929

Scotland

Until 2004 the Scottish Episcopal Church issued as a quarterly newspaper The Scottish Episcopalian, which included contributions from all seven dioceses.  This has since been replaced by a new publication Inspires  , which is also available online.

ARGYLL & THE ISLES: News and Views from around the Diocese, quarterly from c1980 (No 22, Autumn 1985); includes Bishop's Diary and also contributions from individual congregations.

BRECHIN: Brechin Bulletin and Grapevine, monthly periodicals, online from 2009 onwards

ST ANDREWS, DUNKELD & DUNBLANE: Diocesan Quarterly, No. 56 (1964)-no. 72 (1968)

Ireland

ARMAGH: Diocesan Magazine, vol 11/4, April 1978; replaced by The Ambassador, 2008

CLOGHER: Clogher Diocesan magazine, Vol. 1, no. 1 (Jan. 1967).  Description based on: Vol. 12, no. 11 (Nov. 1979)

CORK, CLOYNE & ROSS: Diocesan magazine, United Dioceses of Cork, Cloyne and Ross. Vol.1, No.1 ; Jan.1976-

DUBLIN & GLENDALOUGH: Diocesan Magazine, No. 41 (Jan. 1978)-

MEATH & KILDARE: Meath and Kildare Diocesan MagazineJan. 1975-Dec. 1977.  Also vol. 1, no. 1 (1978)-

OSSERY, FERNS & LEIGHLIN: Diocesan magazine, Ossory, Ferns, Leighlin, Vol.1, no.1 ([1926?])-  Mountrath : The Diocese, [1926?].  Vol. 52, no. 1 (Jan. 1977)-vol. 57, no. 9 (Sept 1982), with some exceptions

Some Roman Catholic diocesan periodicals

WESTMINSTER: Westminster Record, diocesan magazine, volume 2-, 1994-date; online version

LANCASTER:  Catholic Voice of  Lancaster free monthly newspaper; no 221 by July 2010;

PLYMOUTH: Catholic South West newspaper , launched 1995.

CARDIFF: Diocesan Newspaper'' 

MIDDLESBROUGH: Middlesbrough Voice , launched 1981.

EAST ANGLIA: Catholic East Anglia , launched 1984.

NOTTINGHAM: Nottingham Catholic News , launched 1995.

Other current Roman Catholic diocesan newspapers are listed on the website of the Catholic Church in England and Wales

References

Religious magazines published in the United Kingdom
Dioceses of the Church of England
Diocese of Lichfield
Diocese of Oxford
Church in Wales